Mathias Fischer (born July 30, 1971) is a German professional basketball coach and former player. Currently, he is the head coach of Osaka Evessa of the B.League .

Coaching career

Club career
Fischer began his coaching career as an assistant coach with Rhöndorfer TV in 2000 before he took assistant coach positions for Brandt Hagen, BBC Amicale Steinsel and RheinEnergie Köln. Fischer took his first head coach position for the Luxembourg team Black Star Mersch in 2004. Fischer eventually moved to Worthersee Piraten, Allianz Swans Gmunden, and Giessen 46ers. Fischer was appointed head coach of Telekom Baskets Bonn on 5 June 2013.

Luxembourg national team
Fischer coached the Luxembourg national team in 2007.

Awards and accomplishments

Coaching career
German League Champion: (2006)
German Cup Champion: (2005)
Austrian Cup Champion: (2012)

References

External links
 Basketball EuroCup Profile
 EuroBasket Profile

1970 births
Living people
German basketball coaches
Giessen 46ers coaches
Nishinomiya Storks coaches
People from Kędzierzyn-Koźle
Sportspeople from Bonn
Swans Gmunden coaches
Telekom Baskets Bonn coaches
Tigers Tübingen coaches